The Capriol Suite is a set of dances composed in October 1926 by Peter Warlock and is considered one of his most popular works. Originally written for piano duet, Warlock later scored it for both string and full orchestras. According to the composer, it was based on tunes in Thoinot Arbeau's Orchésographie, a manual of Renaissance dances. Nevertheless, Warlock's biographer, Cecil Gray, wrote that "if one compares these tunes with what the composer has made of them it will be seen that to all intents and purposes it can be regarded as an original work".

The work is dedicated to the Breton composer Paul Ladmirault.

The suite consists of six movements: 
Basse-Danse, Allegro moderato, D minor
Pavane, Allegretto, ma un poco lento, G minor
Tordion, Con moto, G minor
Bransles, Presto, G minor
Pieds-en-l'air, Andante tranquillo, G major
Mattachins (Sword Dance), Allegro con brio, F major

The individual movements are very brief; a performance of the suite lasts about 10 minutes.

External links
 
 Capriol Suite at Peter Warlock Society

Compositions by Peter Warlock
Orchestral suites
1926 compositions
Compositions for piano four-hands
Compositions for string orchestra
Compositions for symphony orchestra